Elbert Green Hubbard (June 19, 1856 – May 7, 1915) was an American writer, publisher, artist, and philosopher.  Raised in Hudson, Illinois, he had early success as a traveling salesman for the Larkin Soap Company. Hubbard is known best as the founder of the Roycroft artisan community in East Aurora, New York, an influential exponent of the Arts and Crafts movement.

Among Hubbard's many publications were the fourteen-volume work Little Journeys to the Homes of the Great and the short publication A Message to Garcia.  He and his second wife, Alice Moore Hubbard, died aboard the RMS Lusitania when it was sunk by a German submarine off the coast of Ireland on May 7, 1915.

Early life
Hubbard was born in Bloomington, Illinois, to Silas Hubbard and Juliana Frances Read on June 19, 1856.  In the autumn of 1855, his parents had relocated to Bloomington from Buffalo, New York, where his father had a medical practice. Finding it difficult to settle in Bloomington—mainly due to the presence of several already established doctors—Silas moved his family to Hudson, Illinois the next year. Nicknamed "Bertie" by his family, Elbert had two older siblings: Charlie, who was largely bed-ridden after a fall when he was young, and Hannah Frances, nicknamed "Frank" like her mother. Charlie died at the age of nine, when Elbert was three-and-a-half years old.  Elbert also had three younger sisters who were named Mary, Anna Miranda, and Honor.

The Hubbard children attended the local public school, a small building with two rooms that overlooked a graveyard. Thirty years later, Elbert described his schooling days as "splendid" and "tinged with no trace of blue.... I had no ambitions then—I was sure that some day I could spell down the school, propound a problem in fractions that would puzzle the teacher, and play checkers in a way that would cause my name to be known throughout the entire township." Mary would remember her older brother's role as a school troublemaker, noting that he "annoyed his teachers... occasionally by roaring inappropriately when his too-responsive sense of humor was tickled."

Elbert's first business venture was selling Larkin soap products, a career which eventually brought him to Buffalo, New York. His innovations for Larkin included premiums and "leave on trial".

Religious and political beliefs

Hubbard described himself as an anarchist and a socialist. He believed in social, economic, domestic, political, mental and spiritual freedom. In A Message to Garcia and Thirteen Other Things (1901), Hubbard explained his Credo by writing "I believe John Ruskin, William Morris, Henry Thoreau, Walt Whitman and Leo Tolstoy to be Prophets of God, and they should rank in mental reach and spiritual insight with Elijah, Hosea, Ezekiel and Isaiah." Yet, common themes throughout his works portray him as a capitalist, with his pro-business beliefs and anti-union beliefs.

Hubbard wrote a critique of war, law and government in the booklet Jesus Was An Anarchist (1910). Originally published as The Better Part in A Message to Garcia and Thirteen Other Things, Ernest Howard Crosby described Hubbard's essay as "The best thing Elbert ever wrote."

Another book which was written by Hubbard is titled Health and Wealth. It was published in 1908 and includes many short truisms.

Roycroft

His best-known work came after he founded Roycroft, an Arts and Crafts community in East Aurora, New York in 1895. This grew from his private press which he had initiated in collaboration with his first wife Bertha Crawford Hubbard, the Roycroft Press, inspired by William Morris' Kelmscott Press. Although called the "Roycroft Press" by latter-day collectors and print historians, the organization called itself "The Roycrofters" and "The Roycroft Shops".

Hubbard edited and published two magazines, The Philistine—A Periodical of Protest and The FRA--A Journal of Affirmation. The Philistine was bound in brown butcher paper and featuring largely satire and whimsy. (Hubbard himself quipped that the cover was butcher paper because: "There is meat inside." The Roycrofters produced handsome, if sometimes eccentric, books printed on handmade paper, and operated a fine bindery, a furniture shop, and shops producing modeled leather and hammered copper goods. They were a leading producer of Mission style products.

Hubbard's second wife, Alice Moore Hubbard, was a graduate of the New Thought-oriented Emerson College of Oratory in Boston and a noted suffragist. The Roycroft Shops became a site for meetings and conventions of radicals, freethinkers, reformers, and suffragists. Hubbard became a popular lecturer, and his homespun philosophy evolved from a loose William Morris-inspired socialism to an ardent defense of free enterprise and American know-how. Hubbard was mocked in the Socialist press for "selling out". He replied that he had not given up any ideal of his, but had simply lost faith in Socialism as a means of realizing them.

An example of his trenchant critical style may be found in his saying that prison is, "An example of a Socialist's Paradise, where equality prevails, everything is supplied and competition is eliminated."

In 1908, Hubbard was the main speaker at the annual meeting of The Society in Dedham for Apprehending Horse Thieves. Before he died, Hubbard planned to write a story about Felix Flying Hawk, the only son of Chief Flying Hawk. Hubbard had learned about Flying Hawk during 1915 from Major Israel McCreight.

In 1912, the passenger liner RMS Titanic sank after hitting an iceberg. Hubbard subsequently wrote of the disaster, singling out the story of Ida Straus, who as a woman was supposed to be placed on a lifeboat in precedence to the men, but refused to board the boat, and leave her husband. Hubbard then added his own commentary:

Conviction and pardon
At the beginning of World War I, Hubbard published a great deal of related commentary in The Philistine and became anxious to cross the ocean, report on the war and interview the Kaiser himself. However, Hubbard had pleaded guilty on January 11, 1913, in the court of U.S. District Court Judge John R. Hazel for violating Section 211 of the penal code. Hubbard was convicted on one count of circulating "objectionable" (or "obscene") matter in violation of the postal laws.

Hubbard requested a presidential pardon from William Howard Taft, but the administration discarded the request as "premature". When his application for a passport was denied in 1915, Hubbard went directly to the White House and pleaded with Woodrow Wilson's personal secretary, Joseph P. Tumulty. At the time, the President was in the midst of a cabinet meeting, but Tumulty interrupted and, as a result, the Secretary of State (William Jennings Bryan) and Attorney General Thomas Gregory were also able to hear of Hubbard's situation and need.

The pardon was found to be appropriate, and Hubbard's clemency application process lasted exactly one day. Seventy-five percent of those petitioning for clemency during that fiscal year were not so fortunate; their requests were denied or adversely reported or no action was taken. On receiving his pardon, Hubbard obtained a passport and, on May 1, 1915, left with his wife on a voyage to Europe.

Death
On May 7, 1915, while at sea 11 miles (18 km) off the Old Head of Kinsale, Ireland, the ship was torpedoed and sunk by the German U-boat . His end seems to have followed the pattern he had admired in Mrs. Straus. In a letter to Elbert Hubbard II dated March 12, 1916, Ernest C. Cowper, a survivor of this event, wrote:

The Roycroft Shops, managed by Hubbard's son, Elbert Hubbard II, operated until 1938.

Posthumous recognition
Contributors to a 360-page book published by Roycrofters and titled In Memoriam: Elbert and Alice Hubbard included such celebrities as meat-packing magnate J. Ogden Armour, business theorist and Babson College founder Roger Babson, botanist and horticulturalist Luther Burbank, seed-company founder W. Atlee Burpee, ketchup magnate Henry J. Heinz, National Park Service founder Franklin Knight Lane, success writer Orison Swett Marden, inventor of the modern comic strip Richard F. Outcault, poet James Whitcomb Riley, Nobel Peace Prize recipient Elihu Root, evangelist Billy Sunday, intellectual Booker T. Washington, and poet Ella Wheeler Wilcox.

Hubbard's Message to Garcia essay was adapted into two movies: the 1916 silent movie A Message to Garcia and the 1936 movie A Message to Garcia.

In popular culture
Mack Bolan, the main character of Don Pendleton's fiction series The Executioner, frequently cites as inspiration a Hubbard quote, "God will not look you over for medals, diplomas, or degrees – but for scars."

At the end of Rabbit's Feat, a 1960 Bugs Bunny and Wile E. Coyote cartoon, Bugs quotes Hubbard by saying, "Don't take life too seriously.  You'll never get out of it alive."

The phrase "The graveyards are full of indispensable men" may have originated with Hubbard.

A quote of Hubbard's from his biography of American automotive developer John North Willys, "Do nothing, say nothing, and be nothing, and you'll never be criticized", is often misattributed to Aristotle.

Selected works 
Forbes of Harvard (1894)
No Enemy But Himself (1894)
Little Journeys to the Homes of the Great (1895–1910)
The Legacy (1896)
A Message to Garcia (1899)
A Message to Garcia and Thirteen Other Things (1901)
Love, Life and Work (1906)
White Hyacinths (1907)
Health and Wealth (1908)
The Doctors (1909)
The Mintage (1910)
Jesus Was An Anarchist (1910), also published as The Better Part
An American Bible (1911) Alice Hubbard, Editor
The Silver Arrow (1923)
Elbert Hubbard's Scrap Book (1923)
The Note Book of Elbert Hubbard (1927)
The Philosophy of Elbert Hubbard (1930)

Gallery

See also 
When life gives you lemons, make lemonade – a proverbial phrase based on a quote by E. Hubbard

Explanatory notes

References

Further reading
 Hamilton, Charles Franklin. As Bees in Honey Drown; Elbert Hubbard and the Roycrofters (1973. South Brunswick: A.S. Barnes) .
 Lane, Albert. Elbert Hubbard And His Work: A Biography, A Sketch, And A Bibliography (1901. The Blanchard Press) .
 Leuchtenburg, William E. American Places: Encounters with History (2002. Oxford University Press) .
Rice, Donald Tunnicliff, Cast in Deathless Bronze: Andrew Rowan, The Spanish–American War, and the Origins of American Empire (2016. The West Virginia University Press) 
 Walsdorf, Jack. Elbert Hubbard, William Morris's Greatest Imitator (1999. Yellow Barn Press)

External links

 
 
 
 The Philistine at the HathiTrust
 The Fra at the HathiTrust

"Elbert Hubbard: An American Original", November 2009—PBS / WNED 
The Roycrofter Website
 The Elbert Hubbard papers at the Harry Ransom Humanities Research Center at The University of Texas at Austin
The Winterthur Library Overview of an archival collection on Elbert Hubbard.
 Hubbard Collection is located at the Special Collections/Digital Library in Falvey Memorial Library at Villanova University.

1856 births
1915 deaths
19th-century American writers
20th-century American essayists
19th-century American philosophers
20th-century American philosophers
Arts and Crafts movement
American anarchists
American magazine editors
American publishers (people)
Writers from Bloomington, Illinois
Deaths on the RMS Lusitania
Writers from New York (state)
People from McLean County, Illinois
People from East Aurora, New York
Journalists from Illinois
Private press movement people
American socialists